Bou is a town and commune in the Loiret département of northern-central France.

Bou or BOU may also refer to:

Bou (name)
Bank of Uganda
Basis of Union (disambiguation), various organizations
British Ornithologists' Union
Boulder Geomagnetic Observatory
Bou (film), a 1998 Oriya drama film